Maurice Harris Newmark (March 3,  1859 – 1929) was a US grocer and writer from Los Angeles, California.

Early years
Newmark was born in Los Angeles on March 3, 1859. He was the son of Harris Newmark, pioneer merchant of Los Angeles and founder of a number of the city's enterprises. His mother was Sarah Newmark. He attended private and public schools in Los Angeles from 1865 till 1872, when he went to New York City and there attended a private school for one year. He studied in Paris, France, from 1873 to 1876, and after graduating, returned to Los Angeles.

Career
Upon his return from France, Newmark went to work for the H. Newmark Company. It was established by his father in 1865, and continued under its original name of H. Newmark and Company and under the sole control of its founder until 1885. Up to 1885, the father had associated with Newmark as partners. Other contemporaries included Kaspare Cohn, Samuel Cohn, M. J. Newmark, and M. A. Newmark. With the father's retirement in 1885, the name was changed to M. A. Newmark and Company, and Newmark became a full partner. In business, he served as vice president, Harris Newmark Co.; first vice president, M. A. Newmark & Company; vice president, Los Angeles Brick Company; director, Equitable Savings Bank; director, Standard Woodenware Company; and director, Montebello Land and Water Company.

Newmark was also identified with several civic and commercial organizations in Los Angeles. He served as the harbor commissioner of Los Angeles under appointment by Mayor Alexander, was president of the Associated Jobbers, as well as president of the Southern California Wholesale Grocers' Association. He was a director of the Chamber of Commerce, the Merchants and Manufacturers' Association, and the Board of Trade. He was also a director of the Southwest Museum, as well as an adjunct of the Archaeological Society of America. Newmark was a thirty-second degree Mason and a Shriner.

Selected works
 Sixty Years in Southern California, 1853-1913: containing the reminiscences of H. Newmark. Edited by Maurice H. Newmark, Marco R. Newmark. With 150 illustrations (1916)

References

Bibliography

External links
Portrait of Maurice H. Newmark - University of Southern California Digital Library

1859 births
1929 deaths
Writers from Los Angeles
Businesspeople from Los Angeles
American grocers
American people of German-Jewish descent
Jewish American writers
Newmark family